CityFlyer Express was a short-haul regional airline with its head office in the Iain Stewart Centre next to London Gatwick Airport in England.

In 1993 it became the first British Airways (BA) franchisee operating as British Airways Express. CityFlyer's ownership passed to BA in 1999 when that company bought out the original promoters as well as 3i, the airline's main shareholder at the time. Initially, CityFlyer continued to operate as a separate unit, but it was eventually absorbed into British Airways' mainline short haul operation at Gatwick in 2001, the result of a change in British Airways' strategy for its Gatwick operation.

Following its absorption into British Airways, the airline's turboprops were retired, while the company's fleet of regional short-haul jetliners and the associated crews were transferred to British Airways' regional operation in Birmingham and Manchester. This in turn resulted in British Airways mainline short haul crews based at Gatwick operating most of the erstwhile CityFlyer Express routes using the former's Gatwick-based Boeing 737 fleet.

History

CityFlyer's origins
CityFlyer Express can be traced back to the formation of Connectair in 1983. Connectair became a feeder airline for British Caledonian, at the time the UK's so-called Second Force airline, on 30 May 1984 when it commenced a regional scheduled service between Gatwick and Antwerp with a single, leased Embraer EMB 110 Bandeirante turboprop. A small number of larger capacity, more efficient Shorts 330 turboprops eventually replaced the Embraer Bandeirante.

There was joint ticketing for both airlines, Connectair flight numbers were prefixed with British Caledonian's BR designator, the two-letter International Air Transport Association code identifying the airline on whose behalf a flight is operated, and all of the company's aircraft were painted in the British Caledonian Commuter livery. However, this relationship stopped short of a franchise agreement.

Following British Airways' takeover of British Caledonian in December 1987, Connectair operated its flights under the UK flag carrier's BA designator without adopting the British Airways livery for an interim period.

The ILG era
In June 1988 the firm was acquired by the International Leisure Group (ILG), the parent company of Air Europe. Following ILG's acquisition of Connectair, the airline was re-branded Air Europe Express and adopted a new corporate identity as of 1 February 1989.

ILG's decision to purchase Connectair was part of Air Europe's corporate strategy at the time to establish itself as a major short haul scheduled operator at its Gatwick base. Gatwick had become very busy during the late 1980s. This meant that the much-coveted early-morning peak time slots, which Air Europe needed to be able to operate at times that were attractive to business travellers as well as competitive with its rivals' departure and arrival times, were in increasingly short supply. Connectair held a fairly large number of conveniently timed slots at Gatwick, which it had accumulated since its British Caledonian Commuter days. ILG's acquisition of Connectair therefore represented a golden opportunity to substantially increase the number of slots the group's airlines controlled at Gatwick, thereby strengthening Air Europe's competitive position at that airport.

Air Europe Express flew under the same AE airline designator as its bigger sister airline.

Its scheduled services initially linked Gatwick with Antwerp and Rotterdam.

Larger Shorts 360s gradually replaced the Shorts 330s.

In addition, ILG purchased Guernsey Airlines in April 1989, another small, independent regional airline, which operated scheduled services between Guernsey and Gatwick as well as between Guernsey and Manchester at the time. On 29 October 1989 ILG fully integrated Guernsey Airlines into its existing Air Europe Express operation.

These moves provided Air Europe with additional transfer traffic for its developing short haul European scheduled route network. They also enabled Air Europe to launch new routes where there was insufficient traffic to support its larger Boeing 737 and Fokker 100 jet aircraft or where these aircraft were too big to provide a frequent schedule during the start-up phase, such as Gatwick—Düsseldorf and Gatwick—Jersey for instance.

Following the replacement of the Air Europe Express Shorts 360 turboprops with Air Europe's larger and faster Fokker 100 jets on the Gatwick—Düsseldorf and Gatwick—Jersey routes, Air Europe Express launched a new thrice-daily Gatwick—Birmingham schedule with its Shorts 360s.

During the year ending August 1990 the Air Europe Express operation carried more than a quarter of a million passengers across its route network for the first time.

Air Europe Express was forced to halt its operations on 8 March 1991 along with its sister airlines in the ILG-controlled Airlines of Europe group as a result of its parent company's decision to put all the group's companies into administrative receivership on that day, even though Air Europe Express itself had remained profitable throughout that period.

A new beginning
The management of Air Europe Express quickly started a new airline, Euroworld Airways, and began operations in May 1991 using two Shorts 360 aircraft and staff from the old Air Europe Express. The new carrier also carried on night freight and mail contracts from the defunct airline. The airline soon began flights from Gatwick to Guernsey, Antwerp and Rotterdam, for which two additional Shorts 360s were purchased. At this time, the airline approached several large carriers with a view to establishing a link, but in the event only British Airways was to show any interest, and a code share agreement was struck between the two.

Choosing a new corporate identity
The airline rebranded as CityFlyer Express in 1992.

1992 also marked CityFlyer's second year of operation, during which it managed to break even for the first time. (It had recorded a loss of £0.5mn in its first year of operation.) From this point onwards, the airline was to post a consistent profit.

Launching a new generation of turboprop planes in the UK
CityFlyer Express was the UK launch customer for the ATR 42 regional turboprop, acquiring two in 1992.

In the same year Aer Lingus abandoned the Gatwick to Dublin service, allowing CityFlyer to step in with a daily service.

BA's takeover of Dan-Air also left the Gatwick to Newcastle route vacant for the airline to assume, offering a three-times daily service and requiring a third ATR 42.

The addition of Düsseldorf to the network in 1993 and a frequency increase on the Dublin route led to the acquisition of a fourth ATR.

Formalisation of code-share relationship with British Airways
Meanwhile, the code share agreement had resulted in several complaints being lodged with British Airways by customers expecting a BA flight and the BA product.

BA proposed a solution to this by offering CityFlyer a franchise agreement, which it accepted. This occasion marked the conclusion of the first-ever franchise agreement between British Airways and another airline. It also marked the conclusion of the first franchise agreement in the UK airline industry.

Under this arrangement the CityFlyer aircraft would be painted in full BA livery with interiors and cabin layout conforming to BA's contemporary, standard two-class European product. Staff would wear BA uniforms and all flights would operate under BA flight numbers. British Airways itself would take over CityFlyer's marketing and handle all reservations on its behalf. To all intents and purposes, CityFlyer Express would present itself and trade as British Airways.

The deal came into effect in June 1993.

Further expansion
The franchise agreement allowed CityFlyer Express to take advantage of the UK flag carrier's marketing clout, pricing power as well as its global distribution system (GDS) and worldwide sales force.

The airline was again UK launch customer for the larger, 66-seat ATR 72, the first of which was delivered in October 1994.

By the end of the 1995 financial year, CityFlyer served ten destinations.

Ushering in the jet age
CityFlyer Express acquired its first jet aircraft in March 1997 when it became the first UK-based airline to introduce the Avro RJ100. A second Avro RJ100 was acquired in May of that year. Three more were added in 1998 and a further two joined the fleet in 1999. (At the time, the airline also operated six ATR 42s, one of which was returned to its lessor in 1999, as well as five larger ATR 72s. Three additional ATR 72s were delivered in 1999. Eventually, these replaced the remaining ATR 42s.)

By the turn of the millennium the company's jet fleet had expanded to 16 RJ100s.

Selling out to British Airways
With the franchise agreement due to end in 1999, CityFlyer Express was the second largest slot holder at Gatwick Airport (behind British Airways). It held 96 daily slots at Gatwick, employed 677 people and returned a pre-tax profit of £6.4mn on sales of £89.4mn. The airline's shareholders took the opportunity to realise their investment and put the airline up for sale. HSBC was appointed to handle the process, and approached a number of carriers about the sale. Of the airlines approached, both British Airways and Virgin Atlantic stated their interest to acquire the airline.

At the time Virgin chairman Richard Branson attacked British Airways' intention to bid for CityFlyer Express by claiming publicly that it already had a "total monopoly" at Heathrow and now wanted a "total monopoly" at Gatwick as well, thereby undermining its rivals' ability to compete with it on a level playing field.
  
Disregarding a publicly stated offer from Virgin Atlantic to purchase the company for £100mn, HSBC announced the sale of CityFlyer Express to Virgin's arch-rival British Airways for £75mn in November 1998. This immediately caused controversy, with Richard Branson stating that HSBC never responded to Virgin's offer despite numerous requests from Virgin. CityFlyer's management defended its decision to sell to British Airways by stating that it had never received Virgin's bid in the first place.

This resulted in the already agreed takeover of CityFlyer Express by British Airways being referred to the Competition Commission.

The Competition Commission eventually cleared the sale of CityFlyer Express to British Airways for £75mn in 1999. However, it also imposed a ceiling on the maximum number of slots British Airways and its newly acquired subsidiary CityFlyer Express were allowed to hold at Gatwick.

According to this ruling, British Airways and CityFlyer could control a combined maximum of 41% of all Gatwick slots on an annual basis as well as no more than 70% of the airport's slots on an hourly basis and up to 65% of these slots within a two-hour time span. These limits were designed to enable other airlines to offer competitive schedules on short haul routes where British Airways or CityFlyer was the sole or dominant carrier, without resorting to compulsory slot transfers that would have impeded British Airways' ability to run an effective hub-and-spoke operation at Gatwick.

Background to British Airways' acquisition of CityFlyer Express
The main reason for British Airways' acquisition of CityFlyer Express was the fact that CityFlyer held about 13% of Gatwick slots at the time. BA did not want these to fall into any competitor's hands. BA also needed CityFlyer's slots to expand its Gatwick operation so that it could offer enough feeder services that would help it turn around its loss-making operation at the airport by improving long haul load factors. It was hoped that this would shore up the profitability of the UK flag carrier's long haul routes from Gatwick, thereby enabling it to return the entire Gatwick operation to profitability in the long term.

CityFlyer and its predecessor Connectair had a proven track record of operating a network of regional domestic and European scheduled services from Gatwick profitably. This was in stark contrast to BA's mainline short haul operation at Gatwick, which had racked up huge losses ever since BA had established a major presence at Gatwick as a result of the British Caledonian and Dan-Air takeovers. The losses BA's mainline short haul services generated at Gatwick were at the heart of the unsatisfactory financial performance of the entire Gatwick operation. After the failed attempt to use the acquisition of Dan-Air, which was on the verge of bankruptcy at the end of October 1992, to form a new low-cost, short haul unit within BA's mainline short haul operation at Gatwick, franchising seemed to offer the best solution for providing the level of feeder services BA needed to protect its long-haul loads and profits at Gatwick, without re-creating the complex organisation and fleet mix, and without duplicating the costly overheads of the BA mainline short haul operation at Heathrow, which did not suit the revenue environment at Gatwick. Apart from the additional transfer traffic this generated for BA's long haul services at Gatwick, the main benefit of this arrangement for BA was that CityFlyer was to remain completely independent of the BA mainline operation. The feeder services CityFlyer provided for BA at Gatwick under the franchise agreement did not impact the direct operating costs of BA's mainline operation. CityFlyer also had very low costs as a result of a flat organisational structure and a simple fleet. This suited Gatwick's revenue environment and was the main reason BA decided to make the franchise agreement with CityFlyer Express a central plank of its strategy to achieve sustained, overall profitability at Gatwick.

BA's inability to operate profitably at Gatwick following the acquisition of British Caledonian and Dan-Air
The prime causes for BA's inability to operate profitably at Gatwick are:

 The unwieldy route structure it inherited from British Caledonian.
 The Monopolies and Mergers Commission's decision to require BA to give up 5,000 annual slots at Gatwick to its competitors and to re-apply for some of British Caledonian's short haul feeder routes, as well as the subsequent decision of the Civil Aviation Authority (CAA) to award these routes to rival airlines.
 Its failure to transform the short haul operation inherited from Dan-Air into a low-cost unit within the Gatwick mainline short haul operation.
 The fact that on identical routes with the same fare structure its costs at Gatwick are only marginally lower than at Heathrow, whereas load factors, revenues and yields — the profit per passenger — are significantly lower at Gatwick than at Heathrow.
 Gatwick's location and its smaller catchment area compared with Heathrow.

The route structure with which BA was left following its takeover of British Caledonian in December 1987 was notable for the unplanned and unsystematic manner in which it had grown since the early 1960s.

At the time Sir Freddie Laker had begun building up British United Airways' scheduled route network in his capacity as that airline's managing director. In those days only very limited opportunities existed for wholly privately owned, independent airlines to provide fully fledged scheduled air services on major domestic and international trunk routes. This resulted in a poor fit of many routes in British United's network of scheduled services, thereby making it difficult to offer sensible connections that could be marketed to the travelling public. It also represented the best network structure the late Sir Freddie was able to put in place under the then prevailing regulatory regime.

British Caledonian, which BA acquired at the end of 1987 in what was widely acknowledged to be a rescue deal to prevent that airline from going under and its assets to pass into the hands of foreign-owned or -controlled competitors, had inherited British United's scheduled route structure at the time of its creation in late November 1970 when that carrier was taken over by Caledonian Airways.

The most fitting description for the resulting network of domestic, European and intercontinental long haul scheduled services from Gatwick was a motley collection of routes resembling a rag bag. This made it difficult to develop profitable streams of transfer traffic using Gatwick as a hub. For this reason it was always going to be a challenge to persuade people to fly to Gatwick from relatively minor places like Genoa or Jersey in order to make an onward connection at the airport to what many people would consider secondary places in Africa or South America, and an even greater challenge to do this profitably.

At the height of its commercial success in the late 1970s and early 1980s, British Caledonian managed to turn the dilemma the structure of its route network presented to its advantage by focusing on those routes that carried a very high proportion of potentially very profitable, oil-related, premium business traffic. It even managed to become the preferred carrier of many high-ranking oil industry executives based in Texas, the centre of the global oil industry, by providing convenient, hassle-free connections between Houston/Dallas, Lagos and Tripoli via the airline's Gatwick base. However, the downside of this initially successful strategy was that it made the company dependent on a small number of markets whose fortunes were tied to the commodity price cycle, in often unstable parts of the world, for most of its profits.

Although this worked in British Caledonian's favour when the price of a barrel of crude oil was sky-high during the late '70s/early '80s, it started working against it when the oil price collapsed in the mid-'80s. It also further compounded the firm's growing financial problems at the time, culminating in the financial crisis that led to its takeover by archrival BA.

In July 1987 BA publicly announced its intention to take over its ailing, home-grown rival British Caledonian. This led to a counter bid from ILG who sought to take over British Caledonian themselves and merge it with Air Europe.

Although Air Europe eventually failed to merge with British Caledonian, its management succeeded in having the rival BA bid referred to the Monopolies and Mergers Commission (MMC), a forerunner of today's Competition Commission, by claiming that this deal would destroy the UK's entire independent airline sector if approved without requiring BA to make any concessions to redress the resulting competitive imbalance.

The decision by the MMC to require BA to give up 5,000 annual slots at Gatwick to competitors and to re-apply for some of British Caledonian's most important short haul feeder routes, as well as the subsequent decision by the CAA to award all of these routes to rival, independent airlines left BA's Gatwick operation with only ten short haul routes. This reduction in the number of short haul routes the airline continued to serve from Gatwick was accompanied by a corresponding reduction in the company's Gatwick-based short haul fleet from 14 to ten Boeing 737-200 Advanced aircraft.

The routes the CAA had awarded BA's independent rivals included the most profitable former British Caledonian short haul routes that had generated a substantial amount of transfer traffic for that airline's Gatwick-based scheduled operation, such as London Gatwick — Paris Charles de Gaulle and Gatwick—Brussels. It also included a number of British Caledonian's loss-making domestic routes, such as Gatwick—Glasgow, Gatwick—Edinburgh and Gatwick—Manchester, which were important feeder services for that airline's profitable long haul routes.

The loss of these vital routes to rival airlines and the consequent reduction in the number of passengers making connections between BA's short and long haul flights at Gatwick threatened the company's ability to continue operating profitably on the long haul routes it had inherited at Gatwick from British Caledonian.

BA's acquisition of the bulk of Dan-Air's scheduled activities at the end of October 1992 was intended to create the basis for a new in-house, low-cost unit that would enable the airline to reverse the heavy losses its own mainline operation's Gatwick-based short haul services incurred by transferring its entire short haul operation at the airport to the new unit.

To attain this goal, BA's management unilaterally imposed the pay scales and terms of the old Dan-Air employment contracts on the entire workforce of its Gatwick-based short haul operation at the beginning of 1993. This effectively cut average pay for everyone by 20%.

Management hoped this decision would help bring its short haul operation's costs in line with what Gatwick's revenue environment could sustain to enable it to return to profitability.

However, BA's unilateral decision to force everyone working for its short haul operation at Gatwick to take a pay cut caused bitter feelings towards the company, among both former Dan-Air staff as well as BA's existing employees at Gatwick who were already working for its short haul operation there prior to Dan-Air's acquisition. The former, who were now officially members of the BA family, were upset that they did not enjoy the same pay and terms of employment as the other family members who were working for its long haul operation at the same airport as well as those who were based at Heathrow. The latter were equally upset at having their pay and terms of employment downgraded to what they considered the inferior standards of a charter airline, which their employer had saved from bankruptcy at the eleventh hour.

The resulting unrest among BA's Gatwick-based short haul staff culminated in an unofficial, one-day strike during the first quarter of 1993. As a result of this unofficial industrial action, BA was forced to reverse its earlier decision to cut its Gatwick-based short haul workers' pay unilaterally. These events had clearly demonstrated the power of BA's unionised workforce. The power of the unions representing the affected workers as well as the entrenched attitudes of the middle management within BA's complex, hierarchical organisation also meant that the airline was unable to win any concessions that would have helped it offset the additional costs it was going to face in its short haul operation at Gatwick against increased labour productivity, in return for not cutting those workers' pay.

Therefore, BA's attempt to extend the lower pay scales and less generous terms of employment that prevailed at Dan-Air to align the costs of its short haul operation at Gatwick with the airport's revenue environment eventually turned out to be a costly failure.

BA's failure to simplify its complex, hierarchical organisation to enable it to reduce its overheads has been the main reason that has until now prevented the airline from achieving a cost structure that would make its Gatwick operation profitable. This situation has been further compounded by the fact that the company enjoys fewer economies of scale at Gatwick compared with Heathrow because the firm's operation at the former airport is smaller than the one at the latter.

As a general rule, on average, a full-service scheduled operation at Gatwick with a fare structure that is identical to a similar operation at Heathrow produces a 10% lower load factor. It also generates a 20% lower revenue and results in an up to 25% lower yield.

Although the growing presence of aggressive low-cost, "no frills" airlines on an ever-increasing number of UK domestic and European routes since the late 1990s has rendered this rule largely invalid for short to medium haul operations, it is still valid for most long haul operations where the competition from low-cost airlines is still in its infancy.

Heathrow's and Gatwick's respective geographic location as well as the number of people living within each airport's catchment area accounts for this difference in load factors, revenues and yields.

The former has a bigger catchment area than the latter because more people live north of the Thames than south of it. Heathrow's catchment area includes about three-quarters of London's population and roughly two-thirds of the population in the whole of Southeast England. London is where most of the demand for air travel in the Southeast originates. This means that 5.6mn people in London live in Heathrow's catchment area as opposed to 1.9mn in Gatwick's catchment area (out of an estimated total Greater London population of 7.5mn). The comparable figures for the Southeast are: 6.7mn people in Heathrow's catchment area as opposed to 3.3mn in Gatwick's catchment area (out of an estimated total population of 10mn).

This is of particular significance for the premium travel market as Heathrow's larger catchment area means that it is able to offer more frequent flights to a greater number of destinations with more conveniently timed connections. This, in turn, helps attract a greater number of business travellers who generally tend to be the airlines' most profitable customers. It also means that there are four to five business travellers in Heathrow's catchment area for every business traveller in Gatwick's catchment area.

On the other hand, the differing sizes of Heathrow's and Gatwick's catchment areas are far less significant for non-premium travel as many people are prepared to travel to an airport outside their catchment area to take advantage of a cheaper flight.

However, the growing presence of aggressive low-cost, "no frills" airlines at Luton and Stansted respectively in recent years has somewhat diminished Heathrow's advantage in terms of its catchment area, as far as short to medium haul flights are concerned. Like Heathrow, these airports are located north of the Thames where most of the people in London and the Southeast live and their catchment areas, particularly Luton's, overlap with it.

BA's failed attempt at a "virtual" merger with American Airlines
During the summer of 1996 BA announced that it was planning to enter into a new code- and revenue- as well as profit-sharing alliance with American Airlines.

The planned alliance was the most ambitious and far-reaching commercial airline alliance attempted at the time. It was also dependent on being granted anti-trust immunity by the British Government and the United States Department of Justice as well as the European Commission's Competition Directorate. This mega alliance was meant to replace the much more limited code-share agreement BA had with US Airways since the beginning of 1993, which was not dependent on anti-trust immunity.

The new alliance envisaged merging the transatlantic operations of both airlines by combining all their commercial activities into a joint company, thus making it a "virtual" merger. One of the new alliance's most outstanding features was a plan for an hourly shuttle service between London Heathrow and New York John F Kennedy, the world's busiest and most profitable intercontinental air route.

This meant that BA, which at the time only controlled about 38% of all take-off and landing slots at Heathrow, needed to secure additional prime time slots at Heathrow in order to be able to launch the hourly JFK shuttle. In those days secondary slot trading, where airlines buy and sell take-off and landing slots at congested airports, was still in its infancy and there was uncertainty concerning the legality of this activity.

In anticipation of gaining all necessary approvals for the proposed alliance — including anti-trust immunity, BA decided to reserve the required slots at Heathrow by moving all long-haul services to East, Central and Southern Africa (other than those to South Africa itself) as well as to Latin America to Gatwick over the 1996 summer timetable period as well as the 1996/7 winter timetable period. BA chose to transfer these routes to Gatwick because they generated lower traffic volumes and were therefore less profitable than its routes to North America, the Middle East, the Indian sub-continent as well as the Far East. They also carried relatively few transfer passengers. This meant that the risk of losing these passengers to a competitor because of Gatwick's smaller number of connections compared with Heathrow was fairly low.

BA furthermore decided to transfer a number of barely profitable or wholly loss-making, short haul routes to secondary destinations in the UK and Eastern Europe to Gatwick because BA could use these slots far more profitably to operate additional transatlantic services from Heathrow under this alliance.

With the benefit of hindsight, BA had underestimated the strength of the gathering opposition to its planned "virtual" merger with American Airlines. It had also underestimated its opponents' political clout with the regulatory authorities in the UK and the US as well as the European Union.

At the time Sir Richard Branson publicly referred to this mega alliance as the "alliance from hell". He feared that it was part of a new BA strategy to drive Virgin Atlantic, BA's main UK-based transatlantic competitor, out of business. He therefore wanted to have it stopped at any cost.

BA's US-based transatlantic rivals, especially those that were denied access to Heathrow under the stringent Bermuda II regulatory regime, wanted approval of this alliance to be made dependent upon the successful negotiation of a new UK-US "Open Skies" air services agreement that would supersede Bermuda II and remove all access restrictions to Heathrow.

Eventually, the alliance was effectively killed off when regulators on both sides of the Atlantic demanded that BA should hand over hundreds of slots at Heathrow and that anti-trust immunity should be withheld for the Heathrow—JFK "flagship" route.

At the same time, BA's senior management had become so preoccupied with this alliance that it did not pay any attention to the fundamental changes that were beginning to re-shape the airline industry at the time. These changes were going to have a profound effect on the commercial environment in which BA was operating. They included the inexorable rise of the low-cost, "no frills" airlines, first and foremost EasyJet and Ryanair, in BA's own backyard as well as the growing competitive threat posed by the government-assisted recovery of Lufthansa and Air France, BA's main European full-service, network airline rivals, both of which had been in no position to challenge BA commercially in the early to mid-1990s as they were effectively bankrupt at that time.

For all these reasons the grandiose BA-AA alliance ultimately turned out to be a very costly distraction for BA's management and was the main contributing factor that led to Robert Ayling's downfall who happened to be the BA chief executive during that period.

Project Jupiter
Project "Jupiter" was BA's internal working title for the strategy it had devised to turn the struggling Gatwick operation into a fully fledged hub.

The airline reckoned that this would enable it to turn around the poor overall financial performance of its operation at the airport after years of heavy losses.

BA decided to give its operation there the economies of scale as well as the scope, in terms of flight connections, it considered necessary to attract enough travellers who were prepared to pay fares that were sufficiently high-yield to achieve sustained profitability.

The aim was to make Gatwick the second biggest hub-and-spoke operation on BA's network as well as one of the biggest outside the US.

Within three years from the launch of Project "Jupiter", the BA mainline operation more than doubled the number of long haul aircraft at Gatwick and increased the number of short haul aircraft at the airport by more than half. In addition, the airline's franchisees, notably CityFlyer Express and GB Airways, increased their Gatwick-based fleets as well. During that period the number of BA passengers passing through Gatwick also doubled.
 
The role BA had assigned its franchisees generally and CityFlyer in particular to make Project "Jupiter" work was to provide feeder services that were expected to be profitable in their own right and enable transfer passengers to connect at ease with BA's long haul services at Gatwick, thereby improving those services' load factors and increasing their profitability. Unlike some of the North American commuter carriers that operate under franchise agreements on the same routes as their mainline partners using smaller aircraft at less busy times, BA's franchisees only operated on routes the company's mainline short haul operation could not serve profitably from Gatwick itself due to its higher cost base.

By the turn of the millennium, BA, the firm's franchisees as well as its subsidiaries and partners in the Oneworld global airline alliance together controlled about 40% of all take-off and landing slots at Gatwick and used a fleet of more than 100 aircraft to serve around 120 destinations worldwide from the airport, more than any other airline from any airport in the UK. Together they carried 8m passengers through Gatwick annually. This accounted for almost 30% of the total number of passengers passing through the airport each year during that period. 45% of the passengers travelling with BA and its affiliated carriers through Gatwick were changing flights there. At the time, CityFlyer Express and the other BA franchisees as well as its subsidiaries and partner airlines at Gatwick accounted for 1,000 of these passengers each day.

Ultimately, BA's attempt to make its Gatwick operation profitable by building it up into a full-scale hub-and-spoke operation failed.

When Rod Eddington took over as BA's chief executive in 2000, he initiated a root-and-branch review of the airline's worldwide operation with the aim of improving profitability after it had incurred its first net loss since privatisation during the 1999/2000 financial year.

This included a review of the loss-making Gatwick operation.

At the time Eddington stated that BA's Gatwick operation alone had incurred a loss of £40mn before allocating overheads, in spite of having £4.5bn of assets at the airport, and that it was destroying shareholder value. (Industry sources estimated that during the aforesaid period the total loss for the airline's entire Gatwick operation was £200mn after allocating all overheads.)

Eddington attributed this loss to Gatwick's failure to attract sufficient high-yield traffic. He furthermore stated that Gatwick's loss was entirely accounted for by its mainline short haul operation whose schedules were primarily designed to feed BA's long haul services at the airport. Eddington was of the opinion that this was the wrong way around because there were not enough early morning departures and late-evening arrivals that could have attracted a greater number of locally based business and leisure passengers requiring same-day-return facilities. Also, the long haul route network BA operated from Gatwick at the time strangely resembled the long haul route structure British Caledonian had inherited from British United at the time of its inception three decades earlier. Moreover, in his opinion, the physical constraints imposed on BA's Gatwick operation by the airport's single runway and two terminals meant that the airline could not offer truly competitive schedules, in terms of frequencies and conveniently timed connections. In addition, Eddington also felt that Gatwick's operation was far too fragmented, in terms of what he called the airport's "bewildering array" of operators and their equipment, which substantially increased costs. At the time, in addition to BA's mainline operation, which accounted for the bulk of the airline's scheduled services at Gatwick, all of its UK-based franchisees (with the exception of British Mediterranean and Loganair) as well as the company's subsidiaries and partners provided scheduled services at the airport as well, in some cases with a single aircraft on one route only, operating all aircraft types in their combined inventory except Concorde and some of the smaller commuter planes.

Independent analysts were also of the opinion that the long haul routes BA chose to transfer from Heathrow to Gatwick mainly served what many people considered secondary destinations in Africa and Latin America. These were generally not the type of destinations to which business people, including those living in Gatwick's catchment area, were travelling. On the other hand, popular destinations for business and leisure travel, such as New York, Los Angeles, Chicago, Hong Kong or Singapore were either under-served or not served at all. For instance, at the time BA operated Gatwick's only daily service to New York JFK and there were no direct services from the airport to any of the other aforementioned destinations.

These analysts furthermore pointed to the extent and speed of BA's growth in employment at the airport during that time as a major cause of the huge loss incurred by that operation. Within a relatively short time span of only three years, the airline had increased its headcount at Gatwick alone to 8,500. This was more than the entire 7,700-strong worldwide workforce of British Caledonian at its peak during the early part of the summer in 1986. BA had effectively created a miniature version of its Heathrow-based organisational hierarchy at Gatwick, thereby multiplying its overheads and increasing its cost base at the latter airport.

In October 2000 BA publicly announced its decision to de-hub Gatwick and to turn it into a regional Southeast airport primarily serving leisure-orientated point-to-point routes where most of the demand originated in the Gatwick catchment area.

This was part of a new strategy designed to provide services from Gatwick only if there was sufficient demand in the local catchment area and to do it at a cost the local revenue environment could support.

It was also part of a strategy to deny the low-cost airlines generally and EasyJet in particular the physical space, in terms of airport slots, to continue expanding unabated in the Southeast. The aim of this secondary strategy was to prevent these carriers from posing an ever-greater threat to BA's high-cost, mainline short haul operation at Heathrow, which suffered annual losses to the tune of several hundred million pounds during that period.

BA therefore decided to move all predominantly business-orientated long haul routes (other than those that had to stay at Gatwick due to bilateral constraints, such as its non-stop services to Atlanta, Dallas and Houston) back to Heathrow.  The airline also decided to withdraw all loss-making services from the airport and to simplify its Gatwick-based fleet by reducing the number of aircraft stationed there and operating only two different aircraft types from the airport. Henceforth, all short to medium haul services from Gatwick were to be exclusively operated with Boeing 737s, while Boeing 777s were to be the only aircraft to ply the long haul routes from the airport.

This was accompanied by a reduction in BA's headcount at Gatwick to 3,000 as well as the introduction of a common cabin crew pool for both its short and long haul operations at the airport and a number of other cost-cutting measures.

British Airways' short haul reorganisation 
Under the franchise agreement it had concluded with BA before being taken over in 1999, CityFlyer Express initially operated as an independent business unit within British Airways serving a number of short haul European and UK regional routes from Gatwick that were completely separate from the services BA's mainline operation provided from the airport.

However, following BA's decision to abandon its hub-and-spoke strategy at Gatwick in October 2000, CityFlyer was subsumed into British Airways' mainline operation at Gatwick in 2001, thereby ceasing to exist as a separate entity.

There were two reasons for fully integrating CityFlyer into BA's mainline short haul operation at Gatwick.

The first of these was operational. Although CityFlyer remained a profitable business in its own right following its acquisition by BA and industry analysts familiar with the company expected it to generate a profit of at least £7mn during BA's 2000/1 financial year, BA found that franchising overall had not been the financial success it had hoped. There were too many franchisees whose administrative and sales support actually cost the airline more than the additional revenue resulting from franchise fees and the connecting traffic its franchise partners generated. Therefore, as far as the bigger picture was concerned, BA's senior management felt that the franchise agreements with its various franchisees, all of which were profitable in their own right, had benefited the franchisees more than itself.

The second reason was related to maintaining good industrial relations between management and the workforce, especially those working for the mainline short haul operation at Gatwick. These workers had always regarded the concept of franchising generally and CityFlyer Express in particular as a Trojan horse. They feared that BA's long-term strategy was to hand over its entire, heavily loss-making, mainline short haul operation to profitable franchisees such as CityFlyer, thereby threatening many jobs and the terms of employment of the remaining mainline employees. They also feared that BA would eventually resemble a "virtual" airline.

Therefore, BA's senior management decided that it was prudent to reduce the number of franchise agreements and to make use of franchisees only if it gave BA a presence in markets it did not already serve itself and where there was no prospect of providing such a service profitably through its mainline operation.

Following the integration of CityFlyer Express into BA's mainline short haul operation at Gatwick, all former CityFlyer employees other than flight crew and engineers working on the jet fleet were made redundant. The ex-CityFlyer flight crew and engineers whom BA continued to employ were transferred along with their equipment to BA's regional bases in Birmingham and Manchester.

BA's subsequent decision to retire the former CityFlyer turboprop fleet, resulted in the withdrawal of the airline's services from Gatwick to Antwerp, Guernsey and Rotterdam.

In addition, the fact that the integration of low-cost CityFlyer Express into the high-cost BA mainline short haul operation at Gatwick inevitably meant that formerly profitable CityFlyer routes were now burdened with the expensive BA mainline overheads, necessitated the withdrawal of additional BA short haul services from Gatwick over the course of a few years, including CityFlyer's routes to Cologne and Düsseldorf.

At the same time, British Regional Airlines, another British Airways franchise operator based on the Isle of Man, was acquired by British Airways as well and in 2002 was merged with British Airways' wholly owned regional subsidiary Brymon Airways to form British Airways Citiexpress, which would assume the operation of domestic and European services from UK regional airports.

On 1 February 2006, British Airways Citiexpress was renamed BA Connect.

See also
 List of defunct airlines of the United Kingdom

Facts of interest
 Brad Burgess was instrumental in setting up Connectair. He had been managing director of Air Europe Express and CityFlyer Express, and subsequently he was chairman of Astraeus.
 Flight numbers in the 7000 and 8000 range used to be allocated to CityFlyer Express-operated British Airways franchise flights. Following CityFlyer's integration into the British Airways mainline operation at Gatwick, the latter's scheduled services from the airport to Amsterdam Schiphol, Bordeaux, Dublin, Jersey, Luxembourg, Nice and Toulouse still used flight numbers in these ranges, thus identifying them as former CityFlyer Express routes.

Notes and citations
Notes

Citations

References

External links 

Competition Commission report into merger

Airlines established in 1992
Airlines disestablished in 2006
British Airways
Companies based in Crawley
Defunct airlines of the United Kingdom
3i Group companies
1992 establishments in England
2006 disestablishments in England